This is a list of awards and nominations received by Cassper Nyovest, a South African recording artist and record producer.

African Muzik Magazine Awards 

! 
|-
|2021
| Himself 
| Best Male Southern Africa
| 
|

WatsUp TV  Africa Music Video Awards

!Ref
|-
|rowspan="5"|2016
|rowspan="5"|War Ready
|African Video of the Year
|
|
|-
|Best African Hip Hop Video
|
|
|-
|Best African Performance
|
|
|-
|Best African Male Video
|
|
|-
|Best South African Video
|
|
|-

Channel O Music Video Awards

!Ref
|-
|rowspan="5"|2014
|rowspan="5"|"Doc Shebeleza"
|Most Gifted Male
|
|
|-
|Most Gifted Newcomer
|
|
|-
|Most Gifted Hip Hop
|
|
|-
|Most Gifted Southern Artist
|
|
|-
|Most Gifted Video of the Year
|
|
|-

Metro FM Awards

!Ref
|-
|rowspan="7"|2015
|rowspan="2"|Tsholofelo
|Best Hip Hop Album
|
|
|-
|Best Male Album
|
|
|-
|rowspan="3"|"Doc Shebeleza"
|Best Hit Single
|
|
|-
|Song of the Year
|
|
|-
|Best Music Video
|
|
|-
|"Doc Shebeleza" (Remix)
|Best Remix
|
|
|-
|Listener's Choice Award
|Himself
|
|
|-

South African Music Awards

SA Hip Hop Awards

!Ref
|-
|rowspan="4"|2013
|rowspan="4"|"Gusheshe"
|Song of the Year
|
|
|-
|Best Collaboration
|
|
|-
|Video of the Year
|
|
|-
|Best Freshman
|
|
|-
|rowspan="7"|2014
|rowspan ="2"|Tsholofelo
| Album of the Year
| 
| 
|-
| Best Digital Sales
| 
| 
|-
| rowspan="2"|"Doc Shebeleza"
| Song of the Year
| 
| 
|-
| Video of the Year
| 
| 
|-
| rowspan="3"|Himself 
| Most Valuable Artist
| 
| 
|-
| Hustler of the Year
| 
| 
|-
| Best Male
| 
| 
|-
| rowspan="2"|2020
| "Good for That" 
| Song of the Year 
| 
| rowspan="2"|
|-
| A.M.N (Any Minute Now)
| Album of the Year 
|
|-
|2021
| Himself 
| Artist of the Decade
| 
|

MTV Africa Music Awards

|-
|2015
|Himself
|Best Hip Hop
|
|-
|2016
|Himself 
|Best Live Act
|
|-
|2021
|Himself 
|Best Fan Base
|

Nigeria Entertainment Awards

!Ref
|-
|rowspan="5"|2017
|rowspan="5"|"Himself"
|Best Male African Artist 
|
|
|-

SA AmaPiano Music Awards 

|-
|2021
| Himself 
| Friends of AmaPiano
|

References

Nyovest, Cassper